Lefteris Lazarou is a Greek chef. Born in 1952 at Piraeus, Athens Greece. He is the first Greek chef to have received a Michelin Star and is considered one of the most influential in his country, especially due to his expertise in fish & sea food based dishes. He is the son of a ship chef. He is currently the chef in the Athens-based restaurant called 'Varoulko'  which is considered a high quality dining place. He himself opened Varoulko in 1987. His popularity has peaked from 2010 and onwards due to his involvement in the Greek version of the famous MasterChef cooking show, as one of the three panel-judge chefs. He has taught in the Culinary Institute of America.

References

Greek television chefs
Living people
People from Piraeus
Head chefs of Michelin starred restaurants
Culinary Institute of America people
Year of birth missing (living people)